Figurine is an American electronic music group. The band members, friends since high school, use the pseudonyms David Figurine (Forster David Rudolph), James Figurine (Jimmy Tamborello) and Meredith Figurine (Meredith Landman).

While the band seems to be inactive , all three members are also involved in other bands or have released solo work under their respective Figurine monikers. Mainly a long distance collaboration, the band was a precursor to James Figurine/Tamborello's later, more commercially successful project The Postal Service. Tamborello has also used the Figurine pseudonym for an official remix of Bright Eyes' Easy/Lucky/Free in 2005 and a solo album in 2006. Meredith is also a vocalist for Boothby.

Figurine lyrics commonly tell whimsical love stories involving technology, such as space stations, instant messaging or internet cafes. Their song "New Mate" was featured on the soundtrack of the 2004 cult film Napoleon Dynamite.

Discography

Albums
 Transportation + Communication = Love (1998, re-released in 2002)
 The Heartfelt (2001, re-released in 2005)
 Reconfigurine (2002) - remix album

EPs
 Discard EP (2002)

Singles
 "I Wait for You (By the Telephone)" (1996)
 "Zero Degrees" (2000)
 "IMpossible" (2001)

Other releases
 Split LP - James Figurine vs. David Figurine (2001) - solo material by James Figurine and David Figurine
 Mistake Mistake Mistake Mistake (2006) - James Figurine solo album
- "Virtual Reality Suit (Outake #1)" (1999), Dead Turtle Records

References

External links
 
Figurine at The Indie Music Database

Electronic music groups from California
Musical groups established in 1994